The Hamilton Conservation Authority maintains the greenspace, trails, parks and some attractions in the Hamilton, Ontario, Canada.

The Hamilton Conservation Authority (HCA) has managed the natural environment in partnership with the City of Hamilton and the Province of Ontario to help ensure a safe and sustainable community. As one of 36 conservation authorities in the province, HCA protects water sources, guards against flooding and erosion, manages conservation and recreational lands, and promotes environmental stewardship and education.

The Authority is the region's largest environmental management agency, owning or managing about 4.000 hectares (10,000 acres) of environmentally significant land. Its recreational lands range from long distance trails and relatively passive natural areas, such as the Dundas Valley, Christie Lake and Valens conservation areas, to more developed sites on the lakefront, like Confederation Beach Park and Fifty Point Conservation Area and Marina.

Parks and conservation areas
Christie Lake Conservation Area
Confederation Beach Park
Devil's Punchbowl Conservation Area
Dundas Valley Conservation Area
Eramosa Karst Conservation Area
Felker's Falls Conservation Area
Fifty Point Conservation Area
Fletcher Creek Ecological Preserve
Spencer Gorge Conservation Area
Tiffany Falls Conservation Area
Valens Lake Conservation Area

Attractions
Crooks' Hollow
Griffin House (Ancaster, Ontario)
Westfield Heritage Village
Wild Waterworks

Waterfalls

 Albion Falls
 Baby Webster's Falls
 Borer's Falls
 Buttermilk Falls
 Canterbury Falls
 Darnley Cascade
 Dundas Falls
 Felker's Falls
 Filman Falls
 Great Falls
 Grindstone Cascade
 Hermitage Cascade
 Jones Road Falls
 Little Davis Falls
 Lower Cliffview Falls
 Lower Mills Falls
 Lower Punchbowl Falls
 Lower Sydenham Falls
 Lower Westcliffe Falls
 Middle Sydenham Falls
 Mill Falls
 Mineral Springs Falls
 Mountview Falls
 Princess Falls
 Scenic Falls
 Sherman Falls
 Sydenham Falls
 Tew's Falls
 Tiffany Falls
 Vinemount Middle Falls
 West Vinemount Falls
 Webster's Falls

See also
 List of waterfalls in Hamilton, Ontario
 Toronto and Region Conservation Authority
 Grand River Conservation Authority
 Parks Canada
 Ontario Parks

References

External links
ConservationHamilton.ca

Conservation authorities in Ontario
Organizations based in Hamilton, Ontario
Year of establishment missing